Ludi Boeken (born 1951 in Amsterdam) is a Dutch film producer, director and actor.
His daughter, Julia Levy-Boeken, is an actress.

Biography
He was born in Amsterdam. He attended the London Film School from 1970 to 1973, and Tel Aviv University from 1973 to 1976.

He started his career as a war correspondent for the BBC and for Dutch television in the Middle East, South America, Central America, and Africa.

He is a partner at Acajou Films, a film production company, with Pascal Judelewicz.

In the years of 2004 and 2007, he was executive director of Terranova, a German TV station.

Filmography

As a producer
Unsettled Land (dir. Uri Barbash, 1987).
 (dir. Krzysztof Zanussi, 1988).
Vincent & Theo (dir. Robert Altman, 1990).
La fracture du myocarde (dir. Jacques Fansten, 1990).
Silent Tongue (dir. Sam Shepard, 1993).
Roulez jeunesse! (dir. Jacques Fansten, 1993).
Lucky Punch (dir. Dominique Ladoge, 1996).
Zeus and Roxanne (dir. George T. Miller, 1997).
Kings for a Day (dir. François Velle, 1997).
Train of Life (dir. Radu Mihăileanu, 1998).
Britney, Baby, One More Time (2002)
Deadlines (dir. Ludi Boeken, Michael Alan Lerner, 2004).
Dead Cool (dir. David Cohen, 2004).
The Vintner's Luck (dir. Niki Caro, 2009).Q (dir. Laurent Bouhnik, 2011).Vanishing Waves (dir. Kristina Buozyte, 2012).Jappeloup (dir. Christian Duguay, 2013).

As an actor

As a directorBritney, Baby, One More Time (2002).Deadlines (2004).'' (2009).

References

External links

Dutch male actors
Dutch film directors
Dutch film producers
Living people
Dutch war correspondents
Artists from Amsterdam
Tel Aviv University alumni
1951 births